Mineral Springs Saratoga School District is a public school district based in Mineral Springs, Arkansas, United States. The school district encompasses  of land, including portions of Hempstead County and Howard County serving communities such as Mineral Springs, Saratoga, Lockesburg,  Tollette, Nashville, Fulton, Washington, Ozan, McNab.

The district proves comprehensive education for more than 500 pre-kindergarten through grade 12 students while employing more than 110 teachers and staff. The district and its four schools are accredited by the Arkansas Department of Education (ADE) and AdvancED (formerly North Central Association).

History
The district formed on July 1, 2004 as a result of consolidation of the Mineral Springs School District and Saratoga (Special) School District. In 1966 the two districts absorbed portions of the Howard County Training School District.

On September 14, 2012, the school board voted to immediately close the Saratoga High School when it was discovered it did not offer the required 38 courses that all Arkansas high schools must provide.

Schools 
 Secondary schools
 Mineral Springs High School, located in Mineral Springs, Howard County, and serving more than 150 students in grades 7 through 12.
 Saratoga High School, located in Saratoga, Hempstead County; closed in fall 2012.
 Elementary schools
 Mineral Springs Elementary School, serving more than 200 students in pre-kindergarten through grade 6.
 Saratoga Elementary School, serving more than 100 students in pre-kindergarten through grade 6.

See also

References

Further reading
 (Download)
 (Download)

External links 
 Mineral Springs School District

School districts in Arkansas
Education in Hempstead County, Arkansas
Education in Howard County, Arkansas
School districts established in 2004
2004 establishments in Arkansas